The Last American is a short future history novel by John Ames Mitchell (1845–1918).

Overview
First published in 1889, the novel is the fictional journal of a Persian admiral named Khan-Li, who rediscovers America in 2951 by sailing across the Atlantic. The world has been devastated, and North America virtually wiped out by climatic changes, which had later reversed themselves. Civilization there was just beginning to recover technologically to the level of 1889.

The 1893 edition is a small hardcover book with 78 numbered pages. It is illustrated with half-page etchings inserted into the text and a few full-page etchings. One shows a reconstructed street scene with "costumes and manner of riding... taken from metal plates now in the museum at Teheran"; clearly indicating newspaper advertisements from a print shop. Another, "The Wooden God," is a cigar store Indian; and "The Ruins of the Great Temple" shows a devastated Capitol Building.

Analysis
The book is, on the one hand, a satirical look at ways and customs of the United States as reconstructed from the ruins and the Persians' own spotty histories. It also seems to be a spoof of the archaeological discoveries that were being made at the time. All of the Persians have farcical names (Nōz-yt-ahl is the name of a historian, for example) and often speak in breathless wonder at what they see.

The Last American is among the anti-utopian disaster literature published in the late 19th century, along with Ignatius Donnelly's Caesar's Column and Park Benjamin Jr.'s The End of New York.

Montesquieu's Persian Letters may have provided some degree of inspiration. In its own turn, the book seems to have been a rough model for Aldous Huxley's Ape and Essence.

Dedication 

The dedication on the novella changed between the first edition in 1889 and the edition of 1902. The editions from the first edition through the eighth have the following dedication:

TO THE AMERICAN WHO IS MORE THAN SATISFIED WITH HIMSELF AND HIS COUNTRY THIS VOLUME IS AFFECTIONATELY DEDICATED.

However an edition from 1902 has the following dedication:

TO THOSE THOUGHTFUL PERSIANS WHO CAN READ A WARNING IN THE SUDDEN RISE AND SWIFT EXTINCTION OF A FOOLISH PEOPLE THIS VOLUME IS DEDICATED

References

External links
 
 

1889 American novels
1889 science fiction novels
American science fiction novels
Post-apocalyptic novels
Fiction set in the 30th century